Joseph Anthony Millette (born August 12, 1965) is a former shortstop in Major League Baseball. He played for the Philadelphia Phillies.

References

External links

1965 births
Living people
Major League Baseball shortstops
Philadelphia Phillies players
Baseball players from California
Sportspeople from Walnut Creek, California
Saint Mary's Gaels baseball players
American expatriate baseball players in Canada
Batavia Clippers players
Calgary Cannons players
Charlotte Knights players
Clearwater Phillies players
Edmonton Trappers players
Memphis Chicks players
Reading Phillies players
Scranton/Wilkes-Barre Red Barons players
Spartanburg Phillies players
Tacoma Rainiers players
West Tennessee Diamond Jaxx players